Tanglewood was a Census-designated place in Lee County, Florida during the 1980 United States Census. The population in 1980 was 8,229. The census area was partially annexed by neighboring Fort Myers while the remainder of the area was reassigned to the newly designated CDPs of Whiskey Creek & McGregor.

Geography
The census area of Tanglewood was located at approximately 26.576992 north, 81.897271 west. The census area was located adjacent to the city of Fort Myers and north of Villas. The CDP had a land area of 3.8 square miles (9.8 square kilometers).

References

Geography of Lee County, Florida
Former census-designated places in Lee County, Florida
Former census-designated places in Florida